Zhytomyr Raion is a raion (district) of Zhytomyr Oblast, northern Ukraine. Its administrative centre is located at Zhytomyr. Population: 

On 18 July 2020, as part of the administrative reform of Ukraine, the number of raions of Zhytomyr Oblast was reduced to four, and the area of Zhytomyr Raion was significantly expanded. The January 2020 estimate of the raion population was 

In 1928-39 the raion was known as Troianiv Raion centered in a town of Troianiv (today a small village).

References

 
Raions of Zhytomyr Oblast
1939 establishments in Ukraine